Saša "Caki" Stojanović (born 21 January 1983) is Serbian football coach and a former player. He is an assistant coach with Radnički Niš.

Career
Stojanović played in his own country for Radnički Niš, from where he was scouted by Dutch team PSV Eindhoven. In the 2005/2006 season he played 35 games for F.C. Eindhoven (on loan from PSV), scoring six goals. For the 2007/2008 season Stojanović played for West-Brabantse first division club RBC Roosendaal, and was transferred the following year to Aris Limassol in Cyprus.

In June 2014, he signed a contract for a season with the Romanian club Universitatea Cluj. He ended his deal on 6 January 2015, and in the same day signed an agreement with Red Star Belgrade, in his home country.

Honours

Red Star
 Serbian SuperLiga (1): 2015–16

References

External links
 Saša Stojanović at Srbijafudbal
 Saša Stojanović at Utakmica.rs
 

1983 births
Living people
Association football forwards
Serbian footballers
Serbian expatriate footballers
PSV Eindhoven players
FC Eindhoven players
RBC Roosendaal players
Aris Limassol FC players
Hapoel Haifa F.C. players
Ethnikos Achna FC players
FK Radnički Niš players
FC Universitatea Cluj players
Red Star Belgrade footballers
Serbian SuperLiga players
Eerste Divisie players
Cypriot First Division players
Israeli Premier League players
Liga I players
Expatriate footballers in the Netherlands
Expatriate footballers in Cyprus
Expatriate footballers in Israel
Expatriate footballers in Romania
Serbian expatriate sportspeople in Romania
Serbian football managers